Cytoreductive surgery (CRS) is a surgical procedure that aims to reduce the amount of cancer cells in the abdominal cavity for patients with tumors that have spread intraabdominally (peritoneal carcinomatosis).  It is often used to treat ovarian cancer but can also be used for other abdominal malignancies. 

CRS is often used in combination with hyperthermic intraperitoneal chemotherapy (HIPEC), for some cancer diagnosis it considerably increases life expectancy and reduces the rate of cancer recurrence. 

Its main developer was Paul Sugarbaker who is known for the development of cytoreductive surgery followed by hyperthermic intraperitoneal chemotherapy, or HIPEC, a treatment alternately referred to as the Sugarbaker Procedure.

Ovarian cancer 
Among patients with stage III epithelial ovarian cancer, the addition of HIPEC to interval cytoreductive surgery resulted in longer recurrence-free survival and overall survival than surgery alone and did not result in higher rates of side effects.

Colorectal cancer 
Among colorectal cancer patients with peritoneal carcinomatosis cytoreductive surgery, with the addition of HIPEC can be used to prolong overall survival in patients.

References

Surgery
Mesothelioma
Cancer